Maze, also known as Maze Featuring Frankie Beverly and Frankie Beverly & Maze, is an American soul  band founded by Frankie Beverly in Philadelphia in 1970. Under its original name Raw Soul, the band relocated to San Francisco and was introduced to Marvin Gaye. Gaye took the group on the road with him as one of his opening acts, and in 1976, he suggested that they change their name from Raw Soul. Maze released 9 Gold albums from 1977 to 1993.  Their well-known songs include "Happy Feelin's", "While I'm Alone", "Golden Time of Day", “Southern Girl”, "The Look in Your Eyes", "Joy and Pain", "Before I Let Go", "We Are One", "Back in Stride", "Can't Get Over You" and "The Morning After". The band has maintained a large and devoted following.

Career
Frankie Beverly started the band as Raw Soul in 1970. They recorded a couple of singles on the small Gregar label, but without any major hits. With a few personnel changes, a relocation from Philadelphia to the San Francisco Bay Area in California in 1971, and an introduction to Marvin Gaye, the band became an immediate success. Gaye took the band on the road with him as one of his curtain-raising acts, and in 1976, he suggested that they change their name from Raw Soul to Maze.

Maze signed a recording contract with Capitol Records in 1976, and released their debut album, Maze featuring Frankie Beverly, in 1977.  From that album, the hit singles included "Happy Feelin's", "While I'm Alone", and "Lady of Magic", ultimately giving them their first gold record and earning Maze a devoted following. They also had success with the albums Golden Time of Day (1978), Inspiration (1979) and Joy and Pain (1980). The group has stated that their hit single “Southern Girl” was dedicated to all the southern women from Virginia to Texas.

Their next recording was Live in New Orleans, three quarters of which was recorded at the Saenger Theatre, on November 14–15, 1980. Three of those songs got into the US R&B chart, including "Running Away", "Before I Let Go", and "We Need Love to Live". By that time, the band had a reputation in America and enjoyed a following in the United Kingdom with promotional support from the British DJ Robbie Vincent. In May 1985, Maze sold out eight nights at the Hammersmith Odeon.

The band released their next album, Can't Stop the Love in March 1985, which featured the group's first number one R&B hit "Back In Stride." The Top 5 follow-up, "Too Many Games" was also featured on this album. The latter single also became the band's biggest hit in the UK, where it peaked at number 36 on the UK Singles Chart.

In 1989, they signed with Warner Bros. and released the hit album Silky Soul, plus Back to Basics in 1993, and released the live DVD recording at London's Hammersmith Odeon in 1994. The two albums also attained gold disc status. They had another number one R&B success with "Can't Get Over You".

In 2009, a tribute to the hits of Maze was released. Called Silky Soul Music: An All Star Tribute to Maze Featuring Frankie Beverly, it included modern stars performing Maze's biggest hits with Maze acting as the backing band.

In recent years, it has become tradition for the audience to honor the group by dressing in all white attire, as the group has often worn while performing.

On September 2, 2011, their percussionist and background singer, McKinley "Bug" Williams, died of an apparent heart attack.

Maze continues to tour around the United States as well as Europe to this day.

Discography

Studio albums

Live albums

Compilation albums

Singles

Videos
Live in New Orleans (1981)
Live in Los Angeles (1986)
Live in London (1994)

References

External links

African-American musical groups
American soul musical groups
American funk musical groups
Musical groups established in 1970
Musical groups from Philadelphia